Antonio Romano (born 23 March 1996) is an Italian footballer who plays as a midfielder for  club Taranto.

Club career
Romano made his professional debut in the Lega Pro for Santarcangelo on 17 January 2016 in a game against Arezzo. On 29 January 2018, he joins Casertana on loan.

On 23 November 2019, he signed with Serie C club Pianese.

On 12 July 2020 he joined Turris.

On 26 August 2021, he moved to Pistoiese. On 31 January 2022, Romano was loaned to Imolese until 30 June 2023, with an option to buy.

On 18 August 2022, Romano moved to Taranto on a permanent basis.

International career
Romano represented Italy national under-17 football team at the 2013 FIFA U-17 World Cup.

References

External links
 

1996 births
Living people
People from Cercola
Footballers from Campania
Italian footballers
Association football midfielders
Serie B players
Serie C players
S.S.C. Napoli players
Santarcangelo Calcio players
A.C. Prato players
A.C. Carpi players
Casertana F.C. players
U.S. Pianese players
S.S. Turris Calcio players
U.S. Pistoiese 1921 players
Imolese Calcio 1919 players
Taranto F.C. 1927 players
Italy youth international footballers